USS Falcon (MHC-59) is the ninth ship of Osprey-class coastal minehunters. She is named after the falcon.

References

 

Ships built in Georgia (U.S. state)
1995 ships
Osprey-class coastal minehunters
Ships transferred from the United States Navy to the Republic of China Navy